This is a list of films produced in Sweden and in the Swedish language in the 1930s. For an A-Z see :Category:Swedish films.

1930

1931

1932

1933

1934

1935

1936

1937

1938

1939

External links
 Swedish film at the Internet Movie Database

1930s
Films
Swedish

nl:Lijst van Zweedse films
zh:瑞典電影列表